Paschim Banga Natya Akademi is a learned society for drama and theatre in West Bengal, India. Established on 26 September 1987, it is a wing of the Department of Information and Cultural Affairs, Government of West Bengal. The aim of this society is to develop skill and expertise, to document and archive the history of theater of Bengal, to disseminate information, to understand theories, to promote and project significant creativity in the field.

The Natya Akademi conducts annual theatre festivals, seminars, public lectures, training workshops and publishes research works and books on Bengali drama. It confers Dinabandhu Puraskar and Girish Puraskar, two most prestigious theatre awards in the state, for production playwriting, acting, direction, stagecraft and design and music.

The Natya Akademi owns a number of theatre halls including Academy of Fine Arts (Lady Ranu Mukherjee Mancha), Bijon Theatre, Girish Mancha, Jogesh Mime Akademi, Madhusudan Mancha, Mahajati Sadan, Muktangan Rangalaya, Rabindra Sadan, Sisir Mancha, Sujata Sadan, Tapan Theatre and University Institute Hall. 

The Natya Akademi publishes Natya Akademi Patrika, an annual journal featuring academic essays, lectures, obituaries, play scripts, archival reprints, reports etc. It has also produced some classics like William Shakespeare’s Chaitali Rater Swapno (directed by Utpal Dutt), Girish Chandra Ghosh’s Balidan (directed by Ashoke Mukhopadhyay) and Rabindranath Tagore’s Chirakumar Sabha (directed by Bibhash Chakrabarty) etc.

See also
 Paschimbanga Bangla Akademi
 Manoj Mitra, the current president of Paschimbangya Natya Akademi

References

Theatre in West Bengal
Cultural organisations based in India
State agencies of West Bengal
1987 establishments in West Bengal
Organizations established in 1987